Young Adam is a 2003 British erotic drama film written and directed by David Mackenzie and starring Ewan McGregor, Tilda Swinton, Peter Mullan, Ewan Stewart and Emily Mortimer. The film is based on the 1954 novel of the same name by Alexander Trocchi.

Plot
The film is set in Scotland in 1954. Shiftless young drifter Joe Taylor works on a barge which operates from Glasgow, on the River Clyde, along the Forth and Clyde and Union Canals to Edinburgh. He shares the cramped on-board living quarters with its operators, Les and Ella Gault, and their young son Jim. One day Joe and Les pull the body of a young woman, Cathie Dimly, naked except for a petticoat, from the water. Via flashbacks, we learn Joe knew her, and scenes involving his relationship with  Cathie are juxtaposed with those set in the present time.

After finding Cathie's body, Joe and Les go to a local pub to play darts. Joe leaves Les behind and returns to the barge, where Ella succumbs to his advances. Not wanting to disturb the sleeping Jim, the two engage in sex on the towpath. It proves to be the first of many such encounters they enjoy whenever they can find a few moments away from Les.

In the past, Joe meets Cathie, an office worker, on a beach and the two soon are living together. He aspires to be a writer and spends his days banging on a battered typewriter while she works to support them. Joe begins to suffer from chronic writer's block and Cathie, unhappy with his lack of productivity, accuses him of taking advantage of her. In violent reply to her words, Joe humiliates Cathie, beats and rapes her. He packs his meager belongings and moves out. After tossing his typewriter in a canal, he meets Les, who offers him a job on the barge.

Les eventually becomes aware of Ella and Joe's affair and moves out of the barge, which belongs to her, and Ella and Joe drift into a more serious relationship. When she receives word her brother-in-law has died, she and Joe visit her sister Gwen and invite her to spend a couple of weeks with them. One evening, on the pretext Gwen would like to see a movie, she and Joe leave the barge and go to a pub. After a few drinks, the two have sex in an alleyway.

Eventually, Ella's desire to settle in the suburbs and her no-nonsense supervision of the barge's daily commercial activities put a dampener on the once-unbridled passion in her relationship with Joe, and he packs and leaves.

In the past, Joe and Cathie reunite on the waterfront and have sex beneath a parked truck. She reveals she is two months pregnant with his child, and when Joe nonchalantly begins to walk away, she runs after him, trips, and falls into the water while dressed only in her petticoat. Joe makes no move to rescue her and, when she fails to surface, he panics and runs away.

Past and present converge. Daniel Gordon, a plumber whom Cathie was casually seeing, is arrested and tried for her murder, and Joe spends a few days in the courtroom listening to testimony. Guilt-stricken, he writes an anonymous note absolving Daniel of the crime and leaves it where a courthouse guard can find it. It has no effect on the proceedings, and Daniel is found guilty and sentenced to hang. Unwilling to risk his life, Joe opts not to confess how Cathie really died and sets off for parts unknown.

Cast
Ewan McGregor as Joe Taylor
Tilda Swinton as Ella Gault
Peter Mullan as Les Gault
Emily Mortimer as Cathie Dimly
Therese Bradley as Gwen
Ewan Stewart as Daniel Gordon
Jack McElhone as Jim Gault
Stuart McQuarrie as Bill
Rory McCann as Sam
Pauline Turner as Connie

Production
The film was shot on location in Gullane in East Lothian, along the Union Canals from Edinburgh to Falkirk, on the Forth and Clyde and in Clydebank, Dumbarton, Renton in West Dunbartonshire, Grangemouth and Perth and Kinross.

The film was scored by David Byrne and the soundtrack was released under the title Lead Us Not into Temptation.

The film was screened in the Un Certain Regard section at the 2003 Cannes Film Festival. It was also shown at the Moscow Film Festival, the Edinburgh Film Festival, the Telluride Film Festival, the Toronto International Film Festival and the Athens Film Festival before going into theatrical release in the UK on 26 September 2003. It earned $1,135,673 in the United Kingdom and $2,561,820 worldwide.

When the film was released in the United States, the Motion Picture Association of America rated it NC-17 for "some explicit sexual content," notably a 14-second scene depicting oral sex.

Talking about the rough sex scene with Ewan McGregor, Emily Mortimer said, "There's something really liberating about letting it rip and just going for it. There's no way in real life you'll ever be allowed to get up to all that - I mean, unless you were really into kinky stuff."

Critical reception
The critical consensus states that the film is "A grim mood piece with good performances from the leads." On Metacritic, the film has a score of 67 out of 100 based on 32 critics, indicating "generally favorable reviews".

Philip French of The Guardian called it "a cleverly constructed film that holds the attention throughout its economical 95 minutes. The naturalistic acting has considerable power, with Tilda Swinton giving a characteristically unself-regarding performance and Ewan McGregor steering clear of easy charm. But it is a depressing film exuding hopelessness and inviting us to pity the characters rather than share in their tragic condition."

A.O. Scott of the New York Times observed, "The storytelling is deliberately disjointed, jumping back and forth in time without warning, so that the meaning of events and the connections among them emerge retrospectively. This creates a mood of unease and dislocation, a noirish dread that persists even after certain crucial mysteries are solved. The narrative scheme, the brooding period atmosphere, the understated score (by David Byrne) and the precision of the acting also make the story seem more interesting than it is. Joe, though in some ways fairly passive, is sexually voracious as well as sexually irresistible . . . In the end, Joe's sexuality, while exhibited with quite a bit more explicitness than the old movies would permit, is also what makes Young Adam feel most dated. Its view of male narcissism, as expressed through erotic need, is not only uncritical but also pretentious. The film follows the novel (and many others like it) in assuming, rather than proving, that its hero's selfishness and failure offer clues to the human condition, rather than evidence of individual limitation."

Manohla Dargis of the Los Angeles Times observed, "Unlike the novel, which is written in the first person . . . the film assumes a markedly less claustrophobic, less personal point of view. Everything happens more or less through Joe's eyes, but Mackenzie, having rejected a voice-over narration, never gets inside the character the way Martin Scorsese gets inside Travis Bickle in Taxi Driver . . . While the novel turns Joe into a question mark, Mackenzie takes a more palatable, less ambiguous approach to the character. The casting of McGregor also softens Joe. Even tamped down and without his easy smile, the actor conveys so much natural charm he's a sorry excuse for a moral void. These changes compromise the adaptation but generally improve the story since Trocchi's existentialism has neither the heft of Jean-Paul Sartre nor the pulp pleasures of James M. Cain. Mackenzie may have realized the shortcomings in Trocchi's prose or decided he didn't want to condemn his film commercially. Whichever the case, he has greatly tempered the story's brutality the old-fashioned way: He puts an appealing, sympathetic star at the center and surrounds him with beautiful visuals, with a darkly contrasting color palette of bruising black and blue."

Carla Meyer of the San Francisco Chronicle thought Tilda Swinton's "rich, compelling performance is reason enough to see this uneven picture, which devolves from a riveting romantic triangle to a morality tale without a moral center . . . McGregor has trouble negotiating the role of a man playing at life. He excels at showing the writer's vanity (in captain's hat and jacket, McGregor looks like a rent boy), but not what makes him tick."

Mike Clark of USA Today noted, "This movie is so much the opposite of uplifting that you think Gary Oldman ought to be in it. But it's honestly made, and its second half does linger in the memory."

Derek Elley of Variety called the film "strongly cast" and "a resonant, beautifully modulated relationships drama" that "establishes Mackenzie as an accessible stylist within mid-range [contemporary] British cinema.

Awards and nominations
BAFTA Scotland named it Best Film and honored Ewan McGregor as Best Actor in a Scottish Film, Tilda Swinton as Best Actress in a Scottish Film, and David Mackenzie as Best Director.

McGregor, Swinton, Mackenzie, and the film all were nominated for British Independent Film Awards.

The Director's Guild of Great Britain nominated Mackenzie for the DGGB Award for Outstanding Directorial Achievement in British Film. He won the award for Best New British Feature at the Edinburgh International Film Festival and the London Film Critics' Circle Award for British Newcomer of the Year. London Film Critic's Circle nominations went to the film for Best Film and Ewan McGregor for British Actor of the Year, Tilda Swinton for British Actress of the Year, Emily Mortimer for British Supporting Actress of the Year, and Mackenzie for British Director of the Year and British Screenwriter of the Year.

DVD releases
The Region 2 DVD was released on 29 March 2004. The Region 1 DVD was released by Sony Pictures Home Entertainment on 14 September 2004. It is in anamorphic widescreen format with audio tracks in English and French and subtitles in French. Bonus features include commentary by screenwriter/director David Mackenzie; commentary by Mackenzie, film editor Colin Monie, production designer Laurence Dorman, and actress Tilda Swinton; narration by Ewan McGregor that was deleted prior to the film's release; and an extended scene.

References

External links
 

2003 films
2003 drama films
2000s English-language films
2000s erotic drama films
British erotic drama films
British neo-noir films
British nonlinear narrative films
Films based on British novels
2003 independent films
Films directed by David Mackenzie (director)
Films produced by Jeremy Thomas
Films set in 1954
Films set in Glasgow
Films set in Scotland
Films shot in East Lothian
Films shot in Edinburgh
Scottish films
English-language Scottish films
2000s British films